The Ultimate Women of the Year awards are hosted by Cosmopolitan UK magazine every year. These awards focus on celebrating women from a range of fields including: entertainment, sports, business and music. Cosmopolitan also give awards to celebrate successful men. The awards started in 2006 and are hosted every December in the UK.

Winners

Real Life Categories
 Ultimate Survivor: Sophia Mason
 Ultimate Women's Woman: Safiya Saeed
 Ultimate Man: Chris Green
 Ultimate Family Girl: Charly Lester
 Ultimate Campaigner: Liliane Umubyeyc
 Ultimate Businesswoman: Clare Molyneux
 Ultimate Friends: Natasha Adley & Lisa Meleck
 Ultimate Heroine: Sue Parker

Celebrity Categories
 Ultimate Newcomer: Leona Lewis
 Ultimate Mistress of Music: Rihanna
 Ultimate Comeback Queen: Myleene Klass
 Ultimate Couple: Tess Daly & Vernon Kay
 Ultimate 'Love the Skin you're in' Goddess: Charlotte Church
 Ultimate Celeb Men of the Year: Justin Lee Collins & Alan Carr
 Ultimate Lady Of Film: Cameron Diaz
 Ultimate Top Woman On TV: Ashley Jensen
 Ultimate Woman Who Made Us Care: Angelina Jolie
 Ultimate Sports Superhero: Maria Sharapova
 Ultimate 'Be The Best You Can Be' Woman Of The Year: Katie Price

Real Life Categories
 Ultimate Survivor:  Allison John
 Ultimate Eco Queen: Harriet Lamb
 Ultimate Heroine: Louise Strajnic
 Ultimate Woman's Woman: Sandra Horley
 Ultimate Friends: Emma Freeborn And Laura Holgate
 Ultimate Future Fashion Star: Hannah Marshall
 Ultimate Editor's Choice:  Josie Russell
 Ultimate Save The Planet Pioneer: Emily Cummins
 Ultimate Man: Errol Douglas

Celebrity Categories
 Ultimate Confidence Queen: Alesha Dixon
 Ultimate Fun Fearless Females: Girls Aloud
 Ultimate Mistresses Of Music: Sugababes
 Ultimate Comeback Star: Britney Spears
 Ultimate Hottie: Gethin Jones
 Ultimate Couple: Brad Pitt And Angelina Jolie
 Ultimate Icon: Kim Cattrall
 Ultimate Celeb Man: Gok Wan
 Ultimate TV Presenter: Myleene Klass
 Ultimate Believe In Your Talent Star: Estelle
 Ultimate Sports Superhero: Rebecca Adlington
 Ultimate TV Actress: America Ferrera
 Ultimate Film Actress: Kate Hudson
 Ultimate Against All Odds Star: Heather Frederiksen

2009
 Ultimate Celeb Who Made Us Care: Brooke Kinsella
 Ultimate Newcomer: Pixie Lott
 Ultimate Green Queen: Amanda Jones
 Ultimate Sports Star: Jessica Ennis
 Ultimate Funny Woman: Ruth Jones
 Ultimate Film Actress: Megan Fox
 Ultimate Hottie: Ricky Whittle
 Ultimate Fearless Females: Karen Darke
 Ultimate Young Fashion Entrepreneur: Kate Fearnley
 Ultimate Love Story: John Walker And Rebecca Shone-Walker
 Ultimate TV Presenter: Holly Willoughby
 Ultimate Love-Your-Body Champions: Caryn Franklin And Erin O'Connor
 Ultimate Music Star: Leona Lewis
 Ultimate International Angel: Sarah Spencer
 Ultimate Man Of The Year: Andrew Flintoff
 Ultimate Inspirational Woman: Justice Williams
 Ultimate TV Actress: Lacey Turner
 Ultimate Family Girls: Melissa And Laura Shields

2010
 Ultimate International Music Star – Katy Perry
 Ultimate Fashionista – Nicola Roberts
 Ultimate Campaigner – Leyla Hussein
 Ultimate International Angel - Victoria Ferguson
 Ultimate Man Of The Year – Dizzee Rascal
 Ultimate UK TV Actress – Karen Gillan
 Ultimate Sports Star – Jessica Ennis
 Ultimate US TV Actress – Christina Hendricks
 Ultimate Hottie – Mark Salling
 Ultimate Celebrity Who Made Us Care – Fearne Cotton
 Ultimate Friends -  Joanne Lock And Meghan Fleet
 Ultimate Catwalk Queen – Crystal Renn
 Ultimate UK Music Star – Alexandra Burke
 Ultimate Editor's Choice – Katie Piper
 Ultimate Film Actress -  Gemma Arterton
 Ultimate Woman's Woman – Jasvinder Sanghera
 Ultimate Love Story – Kevin And Jane Whitehead
 Ultimate Fearless Female – Kate Nesbitt
 Ultimate Theatre Star – Sheridan Smith
 Ultimate TV Presenter – Christine Bleakley

2011
 Ultimate Music Star: Jessie J
 Ultimate Campaigner: Kristin Hallenga
 Ultimate TV Personality: Kelly Rowland
 Ultimate Style Queen: Daisy Lowe
 Ultimate Man Of The Year: Chris Jackson
 Ultimate Survivor: Nicole Campbell
 Ultimate Writer: Caitlin Moran
 Ultimate US TV Actress: Blake Lively
 Ultimate Fashion And Beauty Entrepreneur: Daisy Knights
 Ultimate Family Girl: Gemma Dowler
 Ultimate Newcomer: Michelle Dockery
 Ultimate Icon: Debbie Harry
 Ultimate Celeb Men Of The Year: JLS
 Ultimate Love Story: Rachael And Nathan Cumberland
 Ultimate Theatre Star: Amanda Holden
 Ultimate Film Star: Mila Kunis
 Ultimate UK TV Actress: Lauren Socha
 Ultimate Editor's Choice: Lisa And Louise Hawker

2012
 Ultimate Confidence Queens – The Kardashians
 Ultimate Men - One Direction
 Ultimate Campaigners – Ruth Rogers And Natasha Devon
 Ultimate Olympian – Jessica Ennis
 Ultimate UK TV Actress – Vicky McClure
 Ultimate Editor's Choice – Stephanie Kercher
 Ultimate Film Actress – Jennifer Lawrence
 Ultimate Paralympian – Sarah Storey
 Ultimate Family Girl – Melanie Burgess
 Ultimate Fun Fearless Female – Nicole Scherzinger
 Ultimate International TV Actress – Melissa George
 Ultimate Love Story – Emma And Chris Barton
 Ultimate TV Personality – Tulisa Contostavlos
 Ultimate Fundraiser – Polly Brooks
 Ultimate Hottie – Louis Smith
 Ultimate Pop Star -  Cheryl Cole
 Ultimate Style Icon – Kelly Osbourne
 Ultimate Newcomer -  Zawe Ashton
 Ultimate Street Style Icon – Susan Yasemin

2013

Real Life Categories
 Ultimate Campaigner – Sophie Morgan
 Ultimate Love Story – Charlotte And Chris Clark
 Ultimate Editor's Choice – Baroness Doreen Lawrence
 Ultimate Women's Warrior – Sarbjit Athwal
 Ultimate Global Champions – Corrie Fraser And Olivia Barker
 Ultimate Survivor – Jessica Price
 Ultimate New Feminist – Laura Bates
 Ultimate Young Creative Talent – Abygail Bradley

Celebrity Categories
 Ultimate Music Star - Ellie Goulding
 Ultimate Film Actress – Scarlett Johansson
 Ultimate Style Icon – Paloma Faith
 Ultimate TV Personality – Nicole Scherzinger
 Ultimate Export – Little Mix
 Ultimate Radio Personality – Jameela Jamil
 Ultimate Accessories Queen – Lulu Guinness
 Ultimate Sportswoman – Christine Ohuruogu
 Ultimate Celeb Inspiration – Angelina Jolie
 Ultimate Men – Ant And Dec
 Ultimate UK Actress - Sheridan Smith

2014
 Ultimate Style Icon – Abbey Clancy
 Ultimate TV Personality – Mel B
 Ultimate Writer – Lena Dunham
 Ultimate Trailblazer – Paris Lees
 Ultimate #Fabulousfriends – The Saturdays
 Ultimate Game Changer – Dr Neha Pathak
 Ultimate Campaigner – Temi Mwale
 Ultimate Icon – Vivienne Westwood
 Ultimate Love Story – Tom And Ellen Nabarro
 Ultimate Men Of The Year – McBusted
 Ultimate International Music Star – Taylor Swift
 Ultimate Woman Of Courage – Kirsty Howard
 Ultimate Breakthrough Actress – Natalie Dormer
 Ultimate Funny Woman – Morgana Robinson
 Ultimate Inspiration – Elliot Page
 Ultimate UK Music Artist – Ella Henderson
 Ultimate Editor's Choice – Davina McCall
 Ultimate Body Confidence Queen – Bethany Townsend
 Ultimate International Man Of The Year – Samuel L Jackson
 Ultimate Sports Star – Jo Pavey

2015
 Ultimate Woman Of The Year – Rebel Wilson
 Ultimate Solo Artist – Jess Glynne
 Ultimate Business Woman – Karren Brady
 Ultimate Girl Group – Little Mix
 Ultimate Sports Personality – Casey Stoney
 Ultimate Game Changer – Abi Morgan
 Ultimate Icon – Carrie Fisher
 Ultimate TV Personality, With Baileys – Caroline Flack
 Ultimate Trailblazer – Captain Hannah Winterbourne
 Ultimate Campaigner – Meltem Avcil
 Ultimate Empowerment Pioneer – Pavan Amara
 Ultimate Humanitarian – Sajda Mughal
 Ultimate Inspiration – Katie Cutler

Notes

References

Cosmopolitan (magazine)